"Chapter 7: The Reckoning" is the seventh episode of the first season of the American streaming television series The Mandalorian. It was written by the series' showrunner Jon Favreau, directed by Deborah Chow, and released on Disney+ on December 18, 2019. The episode stars Pedro Pascal as The Mandalorian, a lone bounty hunter on the run with "the Child". The episode won a Primetime Emmy Award for Cinematography.

The episode was released early on December 18 so it could include a sneak preview of Star Wars: The Rise of Skywalker, which was released on December 20.

Plot 
The Mandalorian receives a message from Greef Karga. Karga's town has been overrun by Imperial troops led by the Client, who is desperate to recover "the Child". Karga proposes that the Mandalorian use the Child as bait to kill the Client and free the town in return for allowing the Mandalorian and the Child to live in peace; Karga secretly plans to kill the Mandalorian and take the Child to the Client. Sensing this trap, the Mandalorian recruits Cara Dune and Kuiil the Ugnaught to assist him. Despite the Mandalorian's apprehension, Kuiil also brings a rebuilt IG-11, reprogrammed to act as a nurse droid instead of a bounty hunter. Upon arrival on Nevarro they meet Karga and his associates, but en route to the town is attacked by large flying reptile creatures. Karga is injured but the Child uses the Force to heal his wound; in return, Karga shoots his associates, unable to go through with his trap.

The group formulates a new plan: Karga will pretend that Dune captured the Mandalorian, and all three will enter the town to meet the Client while Kuiil returns the Child to the ship, where IG-11 is waiting. During the meeting, the Client receives a call from Moff Gideon, whose stormtroopers and deathtroopers surround the building and open fire, killing the Client. Gideon arrives and boasts that the Child will soon be in his possession. In the desert outside town, two scout troopers track and capture the Child, and leave Kuiil dead on the ground.

Production

Development 
The episode was directed by Deborah Chow and written by Jon Favreau.

Casting 
Nick Nolte was cast as the voice of Kuiil in November 2018. Giancarlo Esposito, Carl Weathers, and Werner Herzog joined the main cast in December 2018 as Moff Gideon, Greef Karga, and the Client, respectively. Gina Carano and Taika Waititi also co-star as Cara Dune and the voice of IG-11. Additional guest starring actors cast for this episode include Adam Pally as a bike scout trooper and Dave Reaves as a Zabrak fighter. Brendan Wayne and Lateef Crowder are credited as stunt doubles for the Mandalorian.

Misty Rosas, Rio Hackford, and Chris Bartlett are credited as performance artists for Kuiil, IG-11, and the RA-7 droid, respectively. Gene Freeman and John Dixon are credited as stunt doubles for Greef Karga and the Client. "The Child" was performed by various puppeteers. The episode features several stormtroopers in a single scene. When the production team realized they did not have enough suits for the troopers, they contacted the 501st Legion, a fan group dedicated to cosplay of stormtroopers, Imperial officers, and other Star Wars villains, to fill in the extra roles.

Music 
Ludwig Göransson composed the musical score for the episode. The soundtrack album for the episode was released on December 18, 2019.

Reception 
"The Reckoning" received critical acclaim. On Rotten Tomatoes, the episode holds an approval rating of 100% with an average rating of 8.4/10, based on 29 reviews. The website's critics consensus reads, "The Mandalorians disparate plot threads coalesce in thrilling fashion during "The Reckoning", with familiar faces making a welcome return and the emotional stakes going into hyperdrive."

In a positive review, Tyler Hersko, of IndieWire, felt the episode was "a superb slice of westernized sci-fi and a much-needed breath of fresh air that will leave viewers rabid to discover what happens next week in the season finale." Alan Sepinwall of Rolling Stone felt that "the episode is as thrilling and entertaining as it is because the season unfolded so simply and carefully."

The episode won the Primetime Emmy Award for Outstanding Cinematography for a Single-Camera Series (Half-Hour).

References

External links 
 
 

2019 American television episodes
Television shows directed by Deborah Chow
The Mandalorian episodes
Television episodes about child abduction